Fernando Matías Benítez (born 13 November 2000) is an Argentine professional footballer who plays as a forward for Racing Club in Uruguay.

Career

River Plate
In 2015, Benítez joined River Plate from the Renato Cesarini academy. He signed a professional contract with River Plate in February 2021 after scoring 5 goals in 20 appearances for the club's reserve team over the previous two seasons.

Loan to Atlanta United 2
On 2 April 2021, Benítez signed on loan with USL Championship side Atlanta United 2, who play in the second-tier of the US soccer pyramid. He made his professional debut on 16 May 2021, starting and scoring for Atlanta against OKC Energy in a 2–2 draw.

References

External links
Fernando Matías Benítez | Atlanta United FC Atlanta United profile

2000 births
Living people
Argentine expatriate footballers
Argentine footballers
Association football forwards
Footballers from Rosario, Santa Fe
USL Championship players
Primera Nacional players
Atlanta United 2 players
Club Atlético River Plate footballers
San Martín de San Juan footballers
Argentine expatriate sportspeople in the United States
Expatriate soccer players in the United States